Cristallerie de Vallérysthal is a French glass works company set up in 1707 at Troisfontaines (Lorraine). It is now part of the group "Les Jolies Céramiques".

Vallérysthal is reputed for its crystal and opaline glassware.

References

External links
 Cristallerie de Vallérysthal official website
 Les Jolies Céramiques group
 Vallérysthal-Portieux glass heritage society

Moselle (department)
Glassmaking companies of France
Glass art
Glass trademarks and brands
French brands
1707 establishments in France
French companies established in 1707
Manufacturing companies established in 1707